This is a list of notable events in music that took place in the year 2003.

Specific locations
2003 in British music
2003 in Irish music
2003 in Norwegian music
2003 in South Korean music

Specific genres
2003 in classical music
2003 in country music
2003 in heavy metal music
2003 in hip hop music
2003 in Latin music
2003 in jazz

Events

January–February
January 6 – The annual Park Lane Group Young Artists festival of contemporary music opens with two concerts in the Purcell Room at the Southbank Centre, London. The first concert, given by the Gallimaufry Ensemble, includes the premiere of a new wind quintet by 23-year-old Benjamin Wallfisch; the second concert features solo bass clarinettist Sarah Watts, who premieres Marc Yeats Vox for solo bass clarinet and Michael Smetanin's Ladder of Escape for bass clarinet with prerecorded ensemble of six bass and two contrabass clarinets.
January 7 – The Philip on Film Live festival (until January 11) opens at the Barbican Centre, London, featuring films with music by Philip Glass performed live by the Philip Glass Ensemble, conducted by Michael Riesman.
January 9 – The Vienna Philharmonic belatedly announce that violist Ursula Plaichinger has become the first official female member of the orchestra, 158 years after their founding and six years after they have been forced to allow women to audition, under threat of having their state subsidies stopped. At the same time, it is disclosed that orchestra boss Clemens Hellsberg has formally banned Plaichinger from giving interviews to the press.
January 10
Andrew Lack, former chief of NBC news, is named the new head of Sony's music division, to the surprise of the music industry, because he had no previous experience of the record industry. He replaced Tommy Mottola, who resigned the previous day amidst reports of friction with higher Sony executives over huge financial losses in the music division.
Following an investigation by The International Federation of the Phonographic Industry and London detectives, police raids in the UK and the Netherlands recover 500 original Beatles studio tapes, recorded during the Let It Be sessions. Five people are arrested. The tapes have been used for bootleg releases for years.
January 13 – The Who guitarist Pete Townshend is arrested by British police on suspicion of possessing and making indecent images of children and of incitement to distribute them. Townshend claims in a statement that he did not download any such images and accessed Web sites advertising child pornography because he was researching material for his autobiography, which will include passages about his abusive childhood.
January 17–February 2 – The Big Day Out festival takes place in Australia and New Zealand, headlined by Foo Fighters, Jane's Addiction and Underworld.
January 18
The Indian Air Force band, the Air Warriors, play a concert in the Homi Baba Auditorium in Colaba (Mumbai), which included Muthuswami Dikshitar's Vathapiganapathi in a version combining military band with traditional Carnatic instruments.
A two-day festival of the music of Mark-Anthony Turnage is given at the Barbican Centre, London, with three world premieres and chamber concerts by the Nash Ensemble and the Birmingham Contemporary Music Group.
January 22 – Nikolaus Harnoncourt cancels a European tour after being ordered by his doctors to take a two-month rest.
January 31 – Johnny Cash releases the music video for "Hurt".
February 3
Police respond to a 911 phone call from one of Phil Spector's neighbors and discover the body of actress Lana Clarkson, with a gunshot wound, at Spector's his home in Alhambra, California. Spector is arrested on suspicion of murder.
The Martin Bashir television film Living with Michael Jackson premieres on ITV in the UK. It airs on ABC in the US three days later. A total of 53 million viewers in the two countries watch the special. 
February 8 – Avril Lavigne scores her third #1 single "I'm with You", making her the second artist in history to have three consecutive #1 songs from a début album in the Billboard Mainstream Top 40.
February 20 – The Station nightclub fire: Fire engulfs a Rhode Island nightclub during a fireworks display which was part of the performance by rock band Great White. The fire quickly spreads across the ceiling, filling the building with thick, black smoke, killing 100 people and injuring 160 others as audience members rush for the exits. Many people are missing for some time, including Great White guitarist Ty Longley, who is later confirmed to be dead.
February 23 – New York City is the site of The 45th Annual Grammy Awards, featuring Nickelback, No Doubt, Foo Fighters, Beyoncé and other performers. Norah Jones wins a total of six awards, including all four in the General field.
February 24 – Robert Trujillo joins Metallica.

March–April
March 3 – Avril Lavigne kicks off her first headlining tour the "Try To Shut Me Up Tour".
March 10
Johnny Cash is admitted to Baptist Hospital in Nashville, Tennessee to undergo treatment for pneumonia.
The Dixie Chicks unleash a firestorm of controversy at a concert in London when lead singer Natalie Maines announces to the audience that "just so you know, we're ashamed the president of the United States is from Texas". The group is dropped from radio playlists all over the United States and receives death threats as a result.
March 21 – Ex-Neighbours star Delta Goodrem releases her debut album Innocent Eyes which became Australia's monster smash hit of 2003 and included the releases of the new singles "Born to Try" and "Lost Without You".
March 24 – Meteora by Linkin Park debuts at number one on the Billboard 200 album chart.
March 25 – Céline Dion begins A New Day..., her Las Vegas residency show. It would run for almost five years and over 700 shows.
April 1 – Dozens of fans walk out during a Pearl Jam concert when lead singer Eddie Vedder makes comments opposing the Iraq war and insulting remarks about U.S. President George W. Bush. Other audience members boo and shout at Vedder telling him to "shut up." Vedder attempts to calm the crowd by adding "just to clarify... we support the troops."
April 4 – Alex Katunich quits Incubus.
April 8 – Godsmack releases their third studio album Faceless.
April 16 – Luther Vandross suffers a severe stroke at his home in New York City. He emerges from a coma six weeks later. 
April 21 – S Club announce live on stage at London's Docklands Arena that they've decided to split up after five years together. Their final single, "Say Goodbye", enters the chart at #2 a month after the announcement. Rachel Stevens from the group launched her successful solo career shortly afterwards with the song "Sweet Dreams My LA Ex".
April 26-27 – The Coachella Valley Music and Arts Festival takes place in California. Headlined by Beastie Boys and Red Hot Chili Peppers, the lineup also features Queens of the Stone Age, Iggy and the Stooges, Ben Harper & the Innocent Criminals, Blur, The White Stripes, Sonic Youth, Black Eyed Peas, Interpol, The Mars Volta, N.E.R.D and Primal Scream.
April 28 – Apple Inc. opens the iTunes Music Store, offering 200,000 songs for download at a cost of 99 cents each. More than 1 million songs are sold in the store's first week.

May–June
May 7 – Pete Townshend is cleared of the charges stemming from his arrest in January on suspicion of possessing child pornography, but is formally cautioned and placed on the sex offenders register for five years.
May 19 – The former TV channel MuchMusic USA relaunches as Fuse.
May 21 – Ruben Studdard wins the second season of American Idol, edging Clay Aiken.
May 24
Turkish singer Sertab Erener wins the Eurovision Song Contest, held in Riga, Latvia, with the song "Everyway That I Can". It is the last time that the contest is a one-night event.
After a 40-year wait, Russian fans of The Beatles finally get to see former Beatle Paul McCartney perform on their soil, on the Red Square in Moscow.
May 31-June 1 – The inaugural Download Festival takes place at Donington Park in Leicestershire, England. Iron Maiden and Audioslave headline the main stage, the latter acting as replacements for original headliners Limp Bizkit. The Scuzz Stage is headlined by A and NOFX.
June 14 
Alexander Kuoppala quit Children of Bodom.
David Del Tredici's Wondrous the Merge for string quartet and narrator, based on a homoerotic poem by James Broughton, makes its controversial debut at the Great Lakes Chamber Music Festival.
Henry Ranta quits Soilwork.
Justin Timberlake and Christina Aguilera kicked off their summer Justified & Stripped Tour.
Los Angeles, California radio station KROQ-FM airs the 11th Annual of the Weenie Roast show with AFI, The Ataris, Blur, Chevelle, Deftones, Finch, Foo Fighters, Godsmack, Good Charlotte, Hot Hot Heat, Interpol, Jane's Addiction, Less Than Jake, Liam Lynch, Staind, Sum 41, Thrice, The Transplants, The Used, The White Stripes and Pete Yorn.
Alice Cooper begins production of his 26th album. It is a departure from the heavy metal sound of previous albums and is more influenced by his albums of the 1970s.
June 20
Beyoncé releases her No.1 debut solo album Dangerously in Love, which would earn her 5 Grammys in a single night. It also spawned two No.1 singles in the US and has sold 11 million copies to date.
Nick Oshiro replaces Ken Jay in Static-X.
June 27–29 – In the Glastonbury Festival, U.K., headline acts include David Gray, R.E.M., Primal Scream, Morcheeba, The Flaming Lips, Radiohead, Super Furry Animals, Lamb, Macy Gray, Feeder, Manic Street Preachers, Moby and Doves. The weather is mostly dry and the festival deemed a success from both a security and entertainment viewpoint by Michael Eavis.

July–August
July 2 
A-Teens and many others perform at the Stockholm Pride festival.
Delta Goodrem is diagnosed with Hodgkin's Disease. 
July 5 – Lollapalooza returns after a six-year absence from the music festival circuit. Jane's Addiction, Audioslave, Incubus and Queens of the Stone Age are among the featured acts.
July 11 – Judas Priest announces that Rob Halford has rejoined the band, with a reunion tour to follow in 2004.
July 14 – The eurodance and alternative rock musician Lynda Thomas made her last public appearance; she suddenly left the music industry and public life altogether.
July 19–20 – The Splendour in the Grass music festival takes place in Byron Bay, Australia, headlined by Powderfinger and Coldplay.
July 20 – An auto accident in Oregon kills three of the four members of The Exploding Hearts, ending the band after just one album. 
July 30 – The Rolling Stones, AC/DC, Rush, The Guess Who and others headline a benefit concert in Toronto, Ontario, Canada, to prove that the city is safe from SARS. With 450 thousand spectators, it is the largest concert in Canadian history.
August 19 – Jessica Simpson releases her third studio album In This Skin. The album would later go triple platinum in the U.S. and would produce the hit single "With You".
August 28 – Madonna sparks media controversy by kissing popstars Britney Spears and Christina Aguilera at the 2003 MTV Video Music Awards. The situation even ignited a quick war of words between Britney Spears and Christina Aguilera over the kiss.

September–October
September 15 – Billy Corgan announces that Zwan has broken up.
September 16
 Ryan Malcolm wins the first season of Canadian Idol.
 David Bowie releases his twenty-third studio album Reality. The album would be Bowie's last for roughly a decade, with Bowie silently and gradually withdrawing into seclusion following an onstage heart attack the following year.
September 22 – Max Cavalera & Gloria Cavalera fire Marcello D. Rapp causing Roy Mayorga & Mike Doling to leave the band Soulfly in protest.
September 23 – Limp Bizkit release Results May Vary their first album in 3 years and their 4th album overall.
October – Indie/Rock band Conway wins the National "Battle of the Bands" Competition at the Fountain Pub in Tottenham, London, UK. The Norfolk, UK, band consists of Chris Burgoyne (vocals), Andrew Norman (lead guitar / vocals), Tristan McKelvey (guitar), Leon Chapman (bass) and Peter Rednall (drums). 
October 4 – Bruce Springsteen and the E Street Band's The Rising Tour concludes after 120 shows over 14 months, with record-setting sales in U.S. stadiums during the summer and early autumn.
October 15 – A two-week-long international conference, "Fuori tempo, dire, fare, sentire la musica oggi", opens in Genoa, Italy, bringing together performers, composers, scholars and administrators from classical, folk and popular music, with a keynote address by Charles Rosen. Featured participants include Nuria Schoenberg (daughter of Arnold Schoenberg and widow of Luigi Nono); musicologist James Harrison; opera conductor Roberto Abbado; violinist Ivry Gitlis; composers Salvatore Sciarrino, Lorenzo Ferrero and Andrea Liberovici; poet Edoardo Sanguineti; popular singer-songwriters Teresa De Sio, Gianna Nannini and Gino Paoli; rock and jazz artists Peppe Servalo and Peppe D'Argenzio of the Piccola Orchestra Avion Travel; and administrators Anna Cammarano (director of classical music at RAI Trade), Gennaro di Benedetto (superintendent of the Teatro Carlo Felice in Genoa) and Joseph Hussek (director of the artistic programme at the Salzburg Festival).
October 16 – Simon & Garfunkel begin their "Old Friends" U.S. reunion tour, twenty years after their 1983 world tour.
October 20 – Britney Spears releases the first single, "Me Against The Music", featuring American singer-songwriter Madonna, from her upcoming album In the Zone, marketed as a comeback single in the US; it goes on to be an international success, reaching the top three in several countries.
October 21 – Delta Goodrem wins 7 ARIA Awards and defeats Amiel's "Lovesong" for and a Gold ARIA for Single of the Year, Born to Try. ARIAs host Rove McManus announced that John Farnham will raise the very loud speakers to 1985/1986's "You're the Voice" after being inducted into the ARIA Hall of Fame.
October 29 – A legal version of the Napster file sharing network relaunches as a pay service, offering song downloads for 99 cents apiece or $9.99 for unlimited listening.

November–December
November 4 – Aaron Carter releases his first compilation album (fifth overall album under Jive Records) Most Requested Hits
November 5 
Cryptopsy rehires Lord Worm.
Evanescence's lead guitarist and founding member Ben Moody leaves the band on their first world tour.
November 6 – Marco Aro quits his vocalist position in The Haunted. The band rehires their first vocalist, Peter Dolving.
November 7 – Bassist Steve "Fuzz" Kmak is fired from Disturbed as a result of personality clashes with others in the band.
November 14
Band Pink Floyd reunites to perform at the funeral of their manager Steve O'Rourke.
Byron Stroud is confirmed as an official member of Fear Factory.
November 18
Blink-182 release their fifth studio album blink-182. This album was regarded as a change of musical style for Blink-182 as the music has darkened and matured since their previous albums.
Britney Spears releases In the Zone. She breaks her own record as the first female artist to have 3 albums in #1 to become the first female artist to have 4 albums in #1 consecutively. 
Michael Jackson releases the compilation album Number Ones.
November 19 – Guy Sebastian becomes the first winner of Australian Idol, receiving a contract with BMG Australia. He subsequently records the studio album, Just As I Am. Shannon Noll was named the runner-up.
November 20 – Michael Jackson is arrested on charges of child molestation. The singer faced similar charges in 1993 that were dropped after an out-of-court financial settlement was reached with the family of a boy. In light of the new accusations, the television network CBS chooses to pull the scheduled November 26 airing of a one-hour television special intended to promote Jackson's new greatest hits album, Number Ones.
November 21 – Korn release their sixth studio album, Take a Look in the Mirror. It is the last album that features the original lineup of Korn.
November 22 – The band Five Iron Frenzy plays its last show at the Fillmore Auditorium in Denver.
December 6
Elvis Costello and Diana Krall are married in a private ceremony at Elton John's estate in England.
P-Funk founder George Clinton is arrested and charged with drug possession in Tallahassee, Florida.
December 8 – Ozzy Osbourne is rushed into emergency surgery after having a serious accident riding an all-terrain vehicle on the grounds of his English estate. Osbourne broke his collarbone, eight ribs and a vertebra in his neck.
December 12 – Mick Jagger is knighted for services to music by the Prince of Wales (now Charles III) at Buckingham Palace.
December 13-14 – The Los Angeles, California radio station KROQ-FM airs the 14th Annual of the Acoustic Christmas show with AFI, Blink-182, Brand New, Chevelle, The Distillers, Jane's Addiction, Jet, KoЯn, Linkin Park, The Offspring, P.O.D., Pennywise, Puddle of Mudd, Rancid, Staind, 311, Thrice and Trapt.
December 30-31 – The New Year's Eve Falls Festival in Australia, traditionally held in Lorne, Victoria, holds events in both Lorne and Marion Bay, Tasmania, at the same time. The same artists perform at both events, alternating between the two venues each night.

Bands formed
See Musical groups established in 2003

Bands reformed
The Stooges
Edge of Sanity

Bands disbanded
See :Category:Musical groups disestablished in 2003

Albums released

January–March

April–June

July–September

October–December

Release date unknown
 25 Miles to Kissimmee – Fools Garden
 All Got Our Runnins EP – The Streets
 Arcade Fire – Arcade Fire
 Bootlegged, Distorted, Remixed and Uploaded – Pitchshifter
 First Demo Tape – Minor Threat || EP
 Kill Sound Before Sound Kills You – Kid 606 
 Live from the Gaiety – The Dubliners (live)
 Natural Wonder - Phoebe Snow
 The Sauce – Eddie Spaghetti
 Still Electric – Primitive Radio Gods
 Strawberry Bubblegum – 10cc – Compilation
 To Madagascar and Back EP/DVD – Flickerstick
 Try Honesty / Living in the Shadows EP – Billy Talent
 Velvet Lined Shell EP – Toyah
 Watching the Snow – Michael Franks (Japanese release)

Top 5 albums of Billboard year
 50 Cent – Get Rich or Die Tryin'
 Norah Jones – Come Away With Me
 Beyoncé – Dangerously in Love
 Michael Jackson – Number Ones
 Dixie Chicks – Home

Top 10 Selling Albums of the Year US 
 Get Rich or Die Tryin' – 50 Cent
 Come Away with Me – Norah Jones
 Stripped – Christina Aguilera
 Number Ones – Michael Jackson
 Meteora – Linkin Park
 Dangerously in Love – Beyoncé
 A Rush of Blood to the Head – Coldplay
 Fallen – Evanescence
 In the Zone – Britney Spears
 Let Go – Avril Lavigne

Popular songs

Classical music
Leonardo Balada – Ebony Fantasies (cantata for choir and orchestra)
George Crumb
A Journey Beyond Time for soprano, percussion quartet and piano.
Otherworldly Resonances for two pianos
River of Life for soprano, percussion quartet and piano
Mario Davidovsky – Duo Capriccioso for piano and violin
Peter Maxwell Davies
Naxos Quartet No. 2
Naxos Quartet No. 3
Péter Eötvös
Erdenklavier-Himmelklavier, for piano
Jet Stream, concerto for trumpet and orchestra
Elisenda Fábregas – Voces de mi tierra for flute, cello and piano
Rolf Gehlhaar – Cybersong for tenor and wearable electronics
Philip Glass
Dreaming Awake for piano
Taoist Sacred Dance for piano and flute
Music from The Sound of a Voice for flute, pipa, violin, cello and percussion
Andrew Glover – The Death of Angels: A Concerto for Violin and Orchestra
Friedrich Goldmann
Herzstück, mini-drama for soprano, flute and guitar 
Klangszenen III for orchestra
Haflidi Hallgrímsson – Cello Concerto
Mauricio Kagel
Andere Gesänge, intermezzi for soprano and orchestra
Auftakte, achthändig for two pianos and two percussionists
Wojciech Kilar –
Lament for mixed choir a cappella
Symphony No. 3 September Symphony
György Ligeti – Hamburg Concerto for solo horn and chamber orchestra with four obbligato natural horns (1998–99, 2003)
Frederik Magle – Phoenix for mixed choir and organ or piano four-hands
Mesías Maiguashca – K.O. Tagebücher, for two cellos, two percussionists and electronics
Henri Pousseur
Arioso monodie for female voice
Javanitas for violin and trombone
Litanie du miel des nuits hivernales for viola and piano
Rossignolade for female voice and clarinet
Voix et vues planétaires, multimedia
Alexander Raskatov – The Last Freedom
Karlheinz Stockhausen
Amour, for saxophone
Klavierstück XIX
Mixtur 2003, for five instrumental groups, four sinewave-generator players, four sound mixers with four ring modulators and sound director
Vibra-Elufa, for vibraphone,
Steven Stucky
Jeu de timbres
Second Concerto for Orchestra

Opera
Deborah Drattell – Nicholas and Alexandra
Philip Glass – The Sound of a Voice
Osvaldo Golijov – Ainadamar
Michael Nyman – Man and Boy: Dada
Krzysztof Penderecki – Ubu Rex
Rachel Portman – The Little Prince
Karlheinz Stockhausen – Sonntag aus Licht (composition completed and, with it, the entire Licht cycle of seven operas)
Jörg Widmann – Das Gesicht im Spiegel

Jazz

Musical theater
Avenue Q – Broadway production ran for 2534 performances (ranked 23rd on the list of all-time Broadway shows)
Belles belles belles, based on songs by Claude François, with music by Claude François, Jean-Pierre Bourtayre and Carolin Petit and lyrics by Claude François and Daniel Moyne; premiered at Olympia in Paris on November 21
Bounce – Chicago and Washington D. C. productions
The Boy from Oz – Broadway production opened at the Imperial Theatre and ran for 365 performances
Caroline or Change, book and lyrics by Tony Kushner and score by Jeanine Tesori, off-Broadway production
Fame on 42nd Street – Broadway production opened at the Little Shubert Theatre on November 11 and ran for 264 performances
The Full Monty –  Melbourne production
Jerry Springer – The Opera –  London production
Joseph and the Amazing Technicolor Dreamcoat –  London revival
Never Gonna Dance – Broadway production opened at the Broadhurst Theatre on December 4 and ran for 84 performances
Showtune, a Jerry Herman musical revue – off-Broadway production
Taboo –  Broadway production opened November 13 and ran for 103 performances
Thoroughly Modern Millie – London production opened October 21, starring Amanda Holden, and ran for 8 months
Tonight's The Night – London production
Wicked – Broadway production opened at the George Gershwin Theatre on October 30, starring Joel Grey, and is still running as of 2019.  It is the fifth-longest-running show in the history of Broadway.

Musical film
 7:35 in the Morning (Academy Award-nominated short)
 The Adventure of Iron Pussy
 Brother Bear (animated feature)
 Camp
 The Cheetah Girls (Disney Channel Original Movie – the first musical film by Disney Channel, bringing in over 84 million viewers)
 End of the Century: The Story of the Ramones
 From Justin to Kelly
 Interstella 5555: The 5tory of the 5ecret 5tar 5ystem
 The Jungle Book 2 (animated feature)
 Love Under the Sun
 A Mighty Wind
 Pas sur la bouche
 Pop Carn, starring Mohanlal and Simran Bagga 
 School of Rock
 The Singing Detective
 Tupac: Resurrection
 Vivir Intentando, starring the group Bandana

Births
January 6 – MattyBRaps, American rapper
January 23 – Bishara, Syrian-Swedish singer
January 24 – Johnny Orlando, Canadian singer-songwriter
February 10 – Blanco, Italian singer and rapper
February 20
Olivia Rodrigo, American singer-songwriter and actress
William Gao, English actor and musician (Wasia Project)
March 1 - Keshav, tabla prodigy
March 25 – George Alice, Australian singer-songwriter
March 26 – Bhad Bhabie, American rapper and songwriter
March 28 – Pháo, Vietnamese rapper and producer
April 11 – Aksel Rykkvin, Norwegian singer 
April 18 – Sophia Grace Brownlee, British singer (Sophia Grace & Rosie)
April 30 – Mikhail Smirnov, Russian singer-songwriter and actor
May 19 – JoJo Siwa, American singer dancer, actress, and YouTube personality
June 1 - Jayda, Filipina singer
June 8 - 347aidan, Canadian rapper
June 27 – Muraki Maito Raul, Japanese singer (Snow Man) 
July 1 – Tate McRae, Canadian singer, songwriter, musician and dancer
July 4 – Polina Bogusevich, Russian singer
July 9 – Savannah Clarke, Australian singer (Now United)
July 28 – Payton Moormeier, American rapper
August 17 – The Kid Laroi, Australian singer
September 1 – Yujin, South Korean singer (IVE)
September 28 - Lauren Spencer-Smith, British-born Canadian singer and songwriter
October 28 – Beatrice Millie McCartney, daughter of Paul McCartney and Heather Mills. The McCartneys fooled the press into publishing misleading details about the birth.
December 9 – Yuna, South Korean singer and dancer (ITZY)

Deaths
January 1 – Giorgio Gaber (63), actor, singer-songwriter
January 5
Doreen Carwithen (80), composer
Daphne Oram (77), composer and electronic musician
January 6 – Hirini Melbourne (53), New Zealand singer-songwriter and poet 
January 8 – Ron Goodwin (77), composer and conductor
January 11 – Mickey Finn (55), bongo player and T.Rex sideman (liver failure)
January 12 – Maurice Gibb (53), Bee Gees singer and bassist (intestinal complications)
January 15 – Doris Fisher (87), singer-songwriter
January 23 – Nell Carter (54), singer and actress (heart disease)
February 1 – Mongo Santamaría (80), Latin jazz percussionist
February 2 
Vincent "Randy" Chin (65), Jamaican record producer
Lou Harrison (85), composer
February 4 – Charlie Biddle, American-Canadian bassist, 76
February 11 – Moses Hogan (55), American pianist and composer
February 16 – Rusty Magee (47), American actor and composer
February 19 – Johnny Paycheck (64), country singer
February 20 – Ty Longley (31), guitarist of Great White (fire accident)
February 23 – Howie Epstein (47), bassist for Tom Petty and the Heartbreakers
February 26 – Othar Turner (95), fife player
March 3
Hank Ballard (75), R&B singer (throat cancer)
Malcolm Williamson (71), composer
March 4 – Celly Campello (60), Brazilian singer-songwriter and actress (breast cancer)
March 8 – Adam Faith (62), singer, actor (heart attack) 
April 1 – Leslie Cheung (46), actor, musician (suicide) 
April 2 – Edwin Starr (61), soul singer (heart attack) 
April 6 – Babatunde Olatunji (75), drummer (diabetes) 
 April 10 – Little Eva (59), singer (cervical cancer)
April 13 – Alex Baroni (35), singer (motorbike accident) 
April 17 – Earl King (69), blues musician 
April 19 – Conrad Leonard (104), composer and pianist 
April 20 – Teddy Edwards (78), jazz saxophonist 
April 21 – Nina Simone (70), singer and pianist 
April 22 – Felice Bryant (77), Hall of Fame songwriter 
May 4 – Arthur Oldham (76), composer and choirmaster
May 11 – Noel Redding (57), bassist of The Jimi Hendrix Experience (cirrhosis)
May 15 – June Carter Cash (73), musician and singer 
May 19 – Ivo Žídek (76), operatic tenor 
May 25 – Jeremy Ward (27), sound technician and guitarist 
May 27 – Luciano Berio (77), composer 
May 30 – Mickie Most (64), record producer (mesothelioma) 
June 6 – Dave Rowberry (63), keyboardist (The Animals) (ulcer haemorrhage)
June 17 – Marcella Pobbé (81), operatic soprano 
July 1 – Herbie Mann (73), jazz flautist (prostate cancer) 
July 3 – Skip Scarborough (58), songwriter 
July 4 
André Claveau (87), singer 
Barry White (58), singer and record producer (renal failure) 
July 5 – Bebu Silvetti (59), pianist, composer, arranger and record producer (respiratory failure) 
July 6
Skip Battin (69), singer-songwriter and bassist
Buddy Ebsen (95), actor and singer 
July 7 – Izhak Graziani (79), conductor 
July 12 – Benny Carter (95), jazz saxophonist, composer, arranger and bandleader (bronchitis) 
July 13 – Compay Segundo (95), Cuban guitarist, singer and composer
July 16 – Celia Cruz (77), salsa singer (brain tumor) 
July 17 – Rosalyn Tureck (89), pianist 
July 25 – Erik Braunn (52), guitarist Iron Butterfly  (heart attack)
July 26 – Richard Wayne Dirksen (81), organist and choirmaster 
July 27 – Bob Hope (100), actor, comedian and singer 
July 30 – Sam Philips (80), producer and founder of Sun Records 
August 2 – Don Estelle (70), actor and singer 
August 5 – Tite Curet Alonso (77), songwriter (heart attack) 
August 6 – Julius Baker (87), flautist 
August 9 – Gregory Hines (58), actor, singer and dancer 
August 10 – Carmita Jiménez, singer 
August 13 – Ed Townsend (74), singer-songwriter 
August 15 – Robert Moulson (70), operatic tenor 
August 18 – Tony Jackson (55), singer and bass player (The Searchers)
August 21 – Wesley Willis (40), novelty musician 
August 23 – Imperio Argentina (96), singer and actress
September 4
Lola Bobesco (82), violinist
Susan Chilcott (40), operatic soprano (breast cancer)
Tibor Varga (82), violinist and conductor
September 5 – Gisele MacKenzie (76), singer
September 7 – Warren Zevon (56), rock and roll singer; mesothelioma
September 12 – Johnny Cash (71), country and rock 'n roll singer
September 14 – John Serry, Sr. (88) concert accordionist, organist, composer, arranger
September 19 – Slim Dusty (76), country singer
September 25 – Matthew Jay (24), English singer-songwriter
September 26 – Robert Palmer (54), singer (heart attack)
September 27 – Donald O'Connor (78), actor, singer and dancer (congestive heart failure)
September 30 – Ronnie Dawson (64), rockabilly singer and guitarist
October 5 – Denis Quilley (75), actor and singer (liver cancer)
October 10 – Eugene Istomin (77), pianist (liver cancer)
October 21 – Elliott Smith (34), singer-songwriter
October 22 – Gabriella Gatti (95), operatic soprano
October 23 – Tony Capstick (59), comedian, actor and musician
October 24 – Rosie Nix Adams, singer-songwriter
October 25 – Robert Strassburg (88), composer, educator, musicologist
October 29 – Franco Corelli (82), operatic tenor
October 30 – Franco Bonisolli (65), operatic tenor
November 5 – Bobby Hatfield (63), singer (The Righteous Brothers)
November 9 – Buddy Arnold (77), jazz saxophonist
November 12 – Tony Thompson (48), drummer of Chic (kidney cancer)
November 14 – Gene Anthony Ray (41), actor and dancer (complications of a stroke)
November 15
Dorothy Loudon (70), actress and singer
Speedy West (79), American guitarist and producer (b. 1924)
November 17
Arthur Conley (57), soul singer (intestinal cancer)
Don Gibson (75), country musician
November 18 – Michael Kamen (55), composer, conductor and musician (heart attack)
November 19 – Greg Ridley (56), English bassist (Humble Pie)
November 26 – Soulja Slim (26), rapper (homicide)
November 28 – Thekra, Tunisian singer (murdered by her husband)
December 8 – Rubén González (84), pianist
December 16 – Gary Stewart (59), country singer (suicide)
December 22 – Dave Dudley (75), country singer (heart attack)
December 27 – Vestal Goodman (74), gospel singer (influenza complications)
December 30 – Anita Mui (40), Hong Kong pop singer
December 31 – Sieglinde Wagner (82), operatic contralto

Awards
The following artists are inducted into the Rock and Roll Hall of Fame: AC/DC, The Clash, Elvis Costello & the Attractions, The Police, The Righteous Brothers

Miscellaneous
Leonard Cohen is made a Companion of the Order of Canada, Canada's highest honour.

ARIA Music Awards
ARIA Music Awards of 2003

Country Music Association Awards
2003 Country Music Association Awards

Eurovision Song Contest
Eurovision Song Contest 2003
Junior Eurovision Song Contest 2003

Grammy Awards
Grammy Awards of 2003

Mercury Music Prize
Boy in Da Corner – Dizzee Rascal wins.

Charts

Triple J Hottest 100
Triple J Hottest 100, 2003

References 

 
2003-related lists
Music-related lists
Music by year